James Arlington Wright (December 13, 1927 – March 25, 1980) was an American poet.

Life
James Wright was born and spent his childhood in Martins Ferry, Ohio. His father worked in a glass factory, and his mother in a laundry. Neither parent had received more than an eighth grade education. Wright suffered a nervous breakdown in 1943, and he graduated a year late from high school, in 1946.

After graduating from high school, Wright enlisted in the U.S. Army and participated in the occupation of Japan. Following his discharge, he attended Kenyon College on the GI Bill, studied with John Crowe Ransom, and published poems in the Kenyon Review. He graduated Phi Beta Kappa in 1952. That year, Wright married Liberty Kardules, another Martins Ferry native. Wright subsequently spent a  year in Vienna on a Fulbright Fellowship, returning to the U.S. where he obtained a master's and a Ph.D. at the University of Washington, studying with Theodore Roethke and Stanley Kunitz.
 
Wright first emerged on the literary scene in 1956 with The Green Wall, a collection of formalist verse that was awarded the prestigious Yale Younger Poets Prize. By the early 1960s, increasingly influenced by the Spanish language surrealists, Wright had dropped fixed meters. His transformation achieved its maximum expression with the publication of the seminal The Branch Will Not Break (1963), which positioned Wright as curious counterpoint to the Beats and New York School and aligned him more with emergent Midwestern neo-surrealist and deep image poetics.

This transformation had not come by accident, as Wright had been working for years with his friend Robert Bly, collaborating on the translation of world poets in the influential magazine The Fifties (later The Sixties). Such influences fertilized Wright's unique perspective and helped put the Midwest back on the poetic map.

Wright had discovered a terse, imagistic, free verse of clarity, and power. During the next ten years Wright would go on to pen some of the most beloved and frequently anthologized masterpieces of the century, such as "A Blessing," "Autumn Begins in Martins Ferry, Ohio," and "I Am a Sioux Indian Brave, He Said to Me in Minneapolis."

Wright's son Franz Wright was also a poet; Franz won the Pulitzer Prize for Poetry in 2004. Together, James and Franz are the only parent/child pair to have won a Pulitzer Prize in the same category.

Wright was a lifelong smoker, and was diagnosed in late 1979 with cancer of the tongue. He died a few months later in Calvary Hospital in the Bronx. His last book of new poems, This Journey, was published posthumously by Random House.

Poetry
Wright's early poetry is relatively conventional in form and meter, especially compared with his later, looser poetry. Although most of his fame comes from his original poetry, Wright made a contribution to another area of literary modernism: the translation.

His work with translations of German and South American poets, as well as the poetry and aesthetic position of Robert Bly, had considerable influence on his own poems; this is most evident in The Branch Will Not Break, which departs radically from the formal style of Wright's previous book, Saint Judas.   In addition to his own poetry, he also published loose translations of René Char's hermetic poems.

His poetry often deals with the disenfranchised, or the American outsider. Wright suffered from depression and bipolar mood disorders and also battled alcoholism his entire life.  He experienced several nervous breakdowns, was hospitalized, and was subjected to electroshock therapy.

His dark moods and focus on emotional suffering were part of his life and often the focus of his poetry, although given the emotional turmoil he experienced personally, his poems can be optimistic in expressing a faith in life and human transcendence.  In The Branch Will Not Break, the enduring human spirit becomes thematic. Nevertheless, the last line of his poem "Lying in a Hammock at William Duffy's Farm in Pine Island, Minnesota" famously reads, "I have wasted my life."

Technically, Wright was an innovator, especially in the use of his titles, first lines, and last lines, which he used to great dramatic effect in defense of the lives of the disenfranchised. He is equally well known for his tender depictions of the bleak landscapes of the post-industrial American Midwest.

Influence and awards
His 1972 Collected Poems won the Pulitzer Prize. In addition to his other awards, Wright received a grant from the Rockefeller Foundation.

Since his death, Wright has developed a cult following, transforming him into a seminal writer of significant influence. Fellow Pulitzer prize for poetry winner Mary Oliver wrote "Three Poems for James Wright" upon his death, and hundreds of writers gathered annually for decades to pay tribute at the James Wright Poetry Festival held from 1981 through 2007 in Martins Ferry.

Works

Published in his lifetime
Unless otherwise noted, year is when published:
 The Green Wall (Yale University Press, 1957)
 Saint Judas (Wesleyan University Press, 1959)
 The Branch Will Not Break (Wesleyan  University Press, 1963)
 Autumn Begins in Martins Ferry, Ohio—Broadside (1963)
 Shall We Gather at the River (Wesleyan University Press, 1967)
 Collected Poems (Wesleyan  University Press, 1971)
 Two Citizens (Farrar, Straus and Giroux, 1973)
 Moments of the Italian Summer (Dryad Press, 1976)
 To a Blossoming Pear Tree (Farrar, Straus and Giroux, 1977)

Published posthumously
 This Journey (1982; completed in 1980)
 The Temple at Nîmes (1982)
 James Wright, In Defense Against This Exile. Letters To Wayne Burns., edited with an introduction by John R. Doheny (1985)
 Above the River, The Complete Poems, introduction by Donald Hall (Noonday Press, University Press of New England, and Wesleyan University Press, 1990)
 Selected Poems (2005)
 A Wild Perfection: The Selected Letters of James Wright (2005)
 The Delicacy and Strength of Lace: Letters Between Leslie Marmon Silko and James Wright., edited by Anne Wright and Joy Harjo  (2009)

See also
 James Wright Poetry Festival

Notes

References
 Saundra Maley, Solitary Apprenticeship: James Wright and German Poetry (Lewiston, Maine: Edwin Mellen Press, 1996).
 Magill, Frank N. Critical Survey of Poetry. Vol. 8. Pasadena: Salem, 1992. Print.
 Storlie, Erik F. Go Deep & Take Plenty of Root:  A Prairie-Norwegian Father, Rebellion in Minneapolis, Basement Zen, Growing Up, Growing Tender.  Recollections of James Wright, Chapters 6-11.  Createspace 2013.

External links 
Mr. James Wright reading a poem of his.
Biography and critical commentary at Modern American Poetry from the University of Illinois at Urbana–Champaign.

1927 births
1980 deaths
People from Martins Ferry, Ohio
20th-century American poets
Hunter College faculty
Kenyon College alumni
Macalester College faculty
People with bipolar disorder
Poets from Ohio
Pulitzer Prize for Poetry winners
University of Washington alumni
University of Minnesota faculty
Yale University alumni
Yale Younger Poets winners
American male poets
20th-century American male writers
United States Army soldiers
Fulbright alumni
Members of the American Academy of Arts and Letters